The Chief of the Metropolitan Police Department of the District of Columbia, generally simply referred to as the Chief of Police, is the head of the Metropolitan Police Department of Washington, D.C. The post is currently held by Robert J. Contee III who assumed the position on January 2, 2021.

History
In 1861, the Metropolitan Police Board unanimously chose one of its members, William Benning Webb, to serve as the first chief of the Metropolitan Police, the formal title at the time being "Major and Superintendent".

With effect from September 16, 1952, the rank and title of Major and Superintendent was abolished and replaced with the position of Chief of Police. Robert V. Murray would be the last Major and Superintendent and the first Chief of Police of the MPD, In 1953 Congress passed the District Government Reorganization Act, establishing a new Metropolitan Police Department with effect from June 26, 1953.

Heads of the Metropolitan Police
The Metropolitan Police has a comprehensive list online of past and present police chiefs.

Chief of the Metropolitan Police Department

Chief of Police, Metropolitan Police

Major and Superintendent of the Metropolitan Police

References

External links
 
 Police Chiefs - Past and Present
 112 Stat. 100, Pub. L. 105-174, § 10007 District of Columbia Chief of Police
 Appointments; assignments; promotions; applicable civil service provisions; vacancies.